Dorra Bouzid (born 1933) is a Tunisian journalist, art critic and feminist.

Life
Dorra Bouzid was born in Sfax. After her father died, her mother Cherifa defied family expectation by moving to Nabeul in the early 1930s, riding a bicycle, teaching primary school and marrying the writer Mahmoud Messadi. Dorra and her sister were educated at a French lycée.

In the late 1940s Bouzid studied at the Ecole des Beaux-Arts in Tunis. However, her mother insisted she study pharmacy to be self-sufficient, and so she enrolled the Faculty of Pharmacy in Paris in 1951. There she joined the North African Muslim Students Association, and helped organize a newspaper combining nationalism and syndicalism, before returning to Tunis to practice pharmacy.

The editor of the nationalist newspaper L'Action recruited Bouzid to write a women's column, which became a full page entitled "Feminine Action'. In 1955 she published there a 'Call for Emancipation Law' demanding full rights for women. The following year Habib Bourguiba promulgated the Code of Personal Status, modernizing the law with regard to women. In 1959 Bouzid became the head editor of the feminist magazine Faiza, recently founded by Safia Farhat. In the early 1960s Dorra was sent by Bourguiba on an informal diplomatic mission to Morocco.

Bouzid was the subject of a 2012 documentary by Walid Tayaa, Dorra Bouzid, une Tunisienne, un combat.

Works
 Ecole de Tunis: Un âge d'or de la peinture tunisienne, 1995

References

1933 births
Living people
Tunisian pharmacists
Tunisian journalists
Tunisian feminists
Tunisian women writers
Art historians
Women art historians
Women pharmacists
Tunisian women